Oliver Charles W Williams (born 28 April 1983) is an English cricketer.  Williams is a right-handed batsman.  He was born in Northampton, Northamptonshire.

Williams represented the Leicestershire Cricket Board in 2 List A matches against Denmark in the 1st round of the 2003 Cheltenham & Gloucester Trophy, and the Kent Cricket Board in the 2nd round of the same competition.  Both matches were held in 2002.  In his 2 List A matches, he scored 7 runs at a batting average of 3.50, with a high score of 4.

He later played club cricket for Hayes Cricket Club in the Kent Cricket League.

References

External links
Oliver Williams at Cricinfo
Oliver Williams at CricketArchive

1983 births
Living people
Cricketers from Northampton
English cricketers
Leicestershire Cricket Board cricketers